Bremen, Illinois may refer to:
 Bremen, Jo Daviess County, Illinois, an unincorporated community
 Bremen, Randolph County, Illinois, an unincorporated community
 Bremen Township, Cook County, Illinois
 Bremen Precinct, Randolph County, Illinois